Hpa-An Airport  is an airport of serving Hpa-an (also spelled Pa-An), a city of Karen in south-eastern Myanmar.

Facilities

Former airlines and destinations

Now, it's not used for public routes.

References

Buildings and structures in Kayin State
Airports in Myanmar